Charbagh is a town in  Tehsil Charbagh, in the Khyber Pakhtunkhwa province of Pakistan. It is located on the N-95 National Highway some 15 km from mingora in Khyber Pakhtunkhwa.

Tehsil Charbagh is also known as Matorizi Tehsil and it borders with Babuzai tehsil and Azikhel Tehsil. Some of the villages included in Tehsil Charbagh are:

 Jehanabad
 Taligram
 Sair
 Shin Kad
 Ganajir
Malam Jaba (

 Koat
 Amanabad
 Roshanabad
 Charbagh
 Mangultan
 Asharbanr
 Toha
 Kandaw
 Khadang
 Alabad
 Dakorak
 Rorya
 Landakey
 Gulibagh
 Alamganj
 Landey
 Navy Kali
 Facebook Page ({https://www.facebook.com/swat.rocks123/?ref=bookmarks})

The University of Swat is 800 meters away from Charbagh bazaar situated in Allahabad,  Cadet College Swat, a premier educational institution of the province, is in Gulibagh and  also the Private University Town are in this Tehsil. The town was also a stronghold of the Taliban in Pakistan, in May 2009 Pakistan government had the town in their sights after routing the Taliban elsewhere in the district.

Population 
The population of Charbagh is 39,605. According to the 2017 census the population of tehsil Charbagh is 126,115. Charbagh tehsil has a population density of 934.9/km2 .

See also 
 Charbagh Tehsil
 Swat District

References

Swat District
Populated places in Swat District